The Revolutionary Socialist Party (or PSR) was a small left-wing party in Portugal, founded in 1978 after the merger of two Trotskyist parties: the Internationalist Communist League ( LCI) and the Workers Revolutionary Party (PRT). The LCI and PRT were both part of the reunified Fourth International. The International recognised the PSR as its Portuguese section.

In 1998 Party renamed itself in order to join with some other left-wing parties in founding the Left Bloc (Portuguese: Bloco de Esquerda or BE). The organisation retains the acronym PSR, and has become the association "Revolutionary Socialist Politics". The historical leader of the PSR is Francisco Louçã, who would become leader of the Left Bloc.

The party had never achieved parliamentary representation before the merger in the Left Bloc, although it may be considered the 3rd or 4th biggest left-wing party in the country.

In the 1970s
In 1979, the Party ran in a legislative election for the first time, achieving 0.6% of the voting. In the next year, another legislative election took place and the Party achieved 1.0% of the votes.

In the 1980s
In 1983, the Party ran in the legislative election in coalition with the People's Democratic Union (Portuguese: União Democrática Popular or UDP) in some constituencies, receiving 0.4% in those constituencies and 0.2% in the others 
In 1985, after some splits, the Party gained a new life, mainly due to its anti-militaristic and anti-racist campaigns and in that year's election, the PSR got 0.6% of the vote. In 1987, the Party contested the first European Election held in Portugal, achieving 0.5%, and in the legislative election, achieving 0.6%.

Also in 1987, the Party started publishing of the Combate (Struggle) monthly newspaper. In elections for the European Parliament of 1989, the PSR got 0.8%.

In the 1990s
In the legislative election of 1991 got 1.12%, the best result in the Party's history. It ran for the last time in an election in 1995, achieving 0.6%.

Left Bloc
In 1998, the party formed a permanent coalition with the People's Democratic Union, the Politics XXI and the Left Revolutionary Front, creating the Bloco de Esquerda (Left Bloc). In 2005, in the last congress in the party's history, it changed its status from a party to a political association, which became extinct in 2013.

External links
PSR association website

2005 disestablishments in Portugal
1978 establishments in Portugal
Defunct communist parties in Portugal
Fourth International (post-reunification)
Left Bloc (Portugal)
Left-wing parties
Political parties disestablished in 2005
Political parties established in 1978
Trotskyist organisations in Portugal